Egon Alfred Klepsch (30 January 1930 – 18 September 2010) was a German politician (CDU).

In the years 1963–1969 Klepsch was Federal leader of the Junge Union. In 1965 he worked briefly as an election campaign manager for Ludwig Erhard. In the same year he was elected to the German Bundestag, to which he belonged until 1980.

Since 1964, Klepsch had been active at the European level. From 1973 he was a Member of the European Parliament in parallel to the Bundestag. After the first direct election of the parliament in 1979 Klepsch became chairman of the European People's Party (EPP) parliamentary group. After he had stood in vain in 1982 for the office of President of the European Parliament, he was elected in 1992 with the support of the EPP and Party of European Socialists parliamentary groups. In 1994 he retired from the European Parliament and became an advisor to Deutschen Vermögensberatungs AG.

Honours

Foreign honours 
  : Honorary Companion of Honour of the National Order of Merit (25 March 1994)

References

1930 births
2010 deaths
People from Děčín
Sudeten German people
Naturalized citizens of Germany
Presidents of the European Parliament
Christian Democratic Union of Germany MEPs
MEPs for Germany 1958–1979
MEPs for Germany 1979–1984
MEPs for Germany 1984–1989
MEPs for Germany 1989–1994
Members of the Bundestag for Rhineland-Palatinate
Grand Crosses 1st class of the Order of Merit of the Federal Republic of Germany
Members of the Bundestag for the Christian Democratic Union of Germany